Comandamenti per un gangster (Commandments for a Gangster) is a 1968 gangster film directed by Alfio Caltabiano

Production
Comandamenti per un gangster was Alfio Caltabiano's second film as a director. It was co-written by film critic and future director Dario Argento. The films script showcases several traits that would later become part of Argento's directorial career. This includes an unseen murderer with black gloves, shots from a murderer's point of view and having the murderer being identified by a physical detail, a scar on his face. The film was shot on location in Yugoslavia.

Release
Comandamenti per un gangster was released in Italy on 22 May 1968 where it was distributed by D.C.I. It grossed a total of 106.073 million Italian lire on its release. It was released in Yugoslavia as Poslednji obracun in 1968.

Reception
In a contemporary review, Pietro Bianchi wrote in Il Giorno that the film was "a skillful attempt at applying the Western formula to the Gangster movie trappings"

See also
 List of crime films of the 1960s
 List of Italian films of 1968
 List of Yugoslav films of the 1960s

Notes

References

External links

1968 films
1960s crime films
Yugoslav crime films
Italian gangster films
Films set in Canada
Films shot in Yugoslavia
Films scored by Ennio Morricone
Films directed by Alfio Caltabiano
Films with screenplays by Dario Argento
1960s Italian films